Events from the year 1713 in France

Incumbents
 Monarch – Louis XIV

Events
11 April – The Second Treaty of Utrecht between Great Britain and France ends the War of the Spanish Succession; France cedes Newfoundland, Acadia, Hudson Bay and St Kitts to Great Britain.

Arts and culture 
 La Foire de Guibray, farce by Alain-René Lesage
 Arlequin Mahomet, farce by Alain-René Lesage
 Le Tombeau de Nostradamus, farce by Alain-René Lesage, first performed at the Foire de Saint Laurent in 1714.

Births

 2 January – Marie Dumesnil, actress (died 1803).
 6 August – Marie Sophie de Courcillon, noblewoman (died 1756).
 3 October – Antoine Dauvergne, composer and violinist (died 1797).
 5 October – Denis Diderot, philosopher (died 1784)
 28 December – Nicolas Louis de Lacaille, astronomer (died 1762).

Deaths
 11 January – Pierre Jurieu, Protestant leader (born 1637)
 24 March – Toussaint de Forbin-Janson, Catholic Cardinal and Bishop of Beauvais (born 1631)
 6 September – François-Séraphin Régnier-Desmarais, ecclesiastic, diplomat and poet (born 1632)
 9 November – Armand Charles de La Porte de La Meilleraye, general (born 1632)

See also

References

1710s in France